Pompilio is a surname. Notable people with the surname include:

Afrânio Pompílio Gastos do Amaral (1894–1982), Brazilian herpetologist
Arsénio Pompílio Pompeu de Carpo (1792–1869), Portuguese slave trader, freemason, poet and journalist
Elvis Pompilio (born 1961), Belgian fashion designer
Luca Pompilio (born 1992), Italian footballer
Numa Pompilio Llona (1832–1907), Ecuadorian poet, journalist, educator, diplomat, and philosopher
Pedro Pompilio (1949–2008), Argentine businessman and football chairman